Thomas Knight (by 1475 – 1518/1520) was an English politician.

He was a Member (MP) of the Parliament of England for Shrewsbury in 1510.

References

15th-century births
16th-century deaths
English MPs 1510